The eloquent horseshoe bat (Rhinolophus eloquens) is a species of bat in the family Rhinolophidae. It is found in Ethiopia, Kenya, Rwanda, Somalia, South Sudan, Tanzania, and Uganda. Its natural habitats are subtropical or tropical moist lowland forests, dry savanna, moist savanna, and caves.

Taxonomy
The eloquent horseshoe bat was described as a new species in 1905 by Danish mammalogist Knud Andersen. The holotype had been collected in Entebbe, Uganda.

References

Rhinolophidae
Mammals described in 1905
Taxa named by Knud Andersen
Bats of Africa
Taxonomy articles created by Polbot